Pushkar Lele (born 14 November 1979) is a Hindustani Classical Vocalist. He is best known for his 'Kumar Gandharva Style Gayaki (singing)'.

Early life
Lele, a child prodigy, was introduced to the world of music while in kindergarten when his aunt gifted him a toy harmonium. He would play National Anthem and other nursery rhymes on the toy harmonium. This is when his mother noticed his musical talent and started his formal music training in light music under Ms. Medha Gandhe.

List of awards
Pandit Vishnu Digambar Paluskar Award, 2001, – Awarded by Sharada Sangeet Vidyalaya, Mumbai
Late Shri. Jaywant & Late Smt. Vasanti Paingankar Smruti Puraskaar, 2004 – Awarded by Pandit Jasraj MitraMandal Public Trust, Pune
Dr.Vasantrao Deshpande Yuva Kalakaar Puraskaar, 2004 – Awarded by Dr. Vasantrao Deshpande Memorial Foundation, Chinchwad
Sur Mani, 2004 – Awarded by Sur-Singar Samsad, Mumbai
Gayanacharya Ramkrishnabua Vaze Puraskaar, 2004 – Awarded to outstanding artistes by Gandharva Mahavidyalaya, Pune
Sudhir Phadke Yuvonmesh Puraskaar, 2006 – Awarded by Indradhanu, Thane
Pandit Jitendra Abhisheki Smriti Yuva Puraskaar, 2011 – Awarded by Tarangini Pratishthan

References

Hindustani singers
1979 births
Living people
Singers from Pune
21st-century Indian male classical singers